Caecilius Metellus may refer to:

 Gaius Caecilius Metellus, a Roman politician in the 80s BC
 Gaius Caecilius Metellus Caprarius, Roman consul in 113 BC
 Lucius Caecilius Metellus (disambiguation)
 Marcus Caecilius Metellus (disambiguation)
 Quintus Caecilius Metellus (disambiguation)

See also
 Caecilii Metelli